The Inter-American Convention on the Elimination of All Forms of Discrimination Against Persons with Disabilities is a regional human rights instrument, adopted in 1999 within the Organization of American States.  It calls on states to facilitate the full integration of persons with disabilities into society through legislation, social initiatives and educational programmes.  It entered into force on 14 September 2001.  

As of 2013, 19 states have ratified the convention.

See also 
American Convention on Human Rights
UN Convention on the Rights of Persons with Disabilities

References

External links 
 Text of the treaty (English, Spanish)
 Text of the treaty (Portuguese)
 Parties (signatories and ratifications)
 Inter-American Commission on Human Rights

Organization of American States treaties
Treaties concluded in 1999
Treaties entered into force in 2001
Disability rights
Treaties of Argentina
Treaties of Bolivia
Treaties of Brazil
Treaties of Chile
Treaties of Colombia
Treaties of Costa Rica
Treaties of the Dominican Republic
Treaties of Ecuador
Treaties of El Salvador
Treaties of Guatemala
Treaties of Haiti
Treaties of Honduras
Treaties of Mexico
Treaties of Nicaragua
Treaties of Paraguay
Treaties of Panama
Treaties of Peru
Treaties of Uruguay
Treaties of Venezuela
Anti-discrimination treaties
1999 in Guatemala